A skeleton key is a key that has been filed in such a way as to bypass the security measures placed inside a warded lock.

Skeleton Key may also refer to:
 Skeleton Key (novel), a novel by Anthony Horowitz published in 2002
 The Skeleton Key, a detective novel by Bernard Capes, published posthumously in 1920
 Skeleton Key (band), a rock band
 Skeleton Key (comics), a comic book by Andi Watson
 The Skeleton Key, a 2005 film
 Skeleton Key: A Dictionary for Deadheads, a book by David Shenk and Steve Silberman
 "Skeleton Key", a song by Days Of The New from their second album 
 "The Skeleton Key", a song by Epica from Omega
 Skeleton Key Records, a Liverpool-based independent record label

See also
 A Skeleton Key to Finnegans Wake, a work of literary criticism by Joseph Campbell and Henry Morton Robinson
 "Three Skeleton Key", a short story by George G. Toudouze